Thomas N. George (born May 2, 1938, in Worcester, Massachusetts) is a Massachusetts politician who represented the First Barnstable District in the Massachusetts House of Representatives from 1997 to 2005. He served 25 years as the Town Moderator of Yarmouth, Massachusetts.

References

1938 births
Living people
University of Massachusetts Amherst alumni
New England Law Boston alumni
Republican Party members of the Massachusetts House of Representatives
Massachusetts lawyers
People from Yarmouth, Massachusetts
Politicians from Worcester, Massachusetts